The Mariposa School of Skating, located in Barrie, Ontario, is a major figure skating training center in Canada.

History
The school was founded in Orillia, Ontario in 1973 by Doug Leigh and Tom Harrison. The school moved to Barrie in 1988 after the Orillia city council refused to allow the building of a new rink on land to be donated to the school by Georgian College.

The current head coaches at Mariposa are Leigh for singles, Lee Barkell for pairs, and David Islam for ice dancing. David Islam and Paul Matheson will become the co-owners in June 2017.

Leigh began a novice skating career, but had to quit at age 16 to finish his schooling. However, he had the opportunity of competing in the Junior Championships of Canada in 1966, finishing in second place. In 1969 he began his coaching career and since embarking on the Mariposa skating school he has coached at 6 Olympic competitions and 26 World Championships. The name "Mariposa", which means "butterfly" in Spanish, refers to author Stephen Leacock's fictional name for Orillia, the school's original home.

Programs
The Mariposa School of Skating has many different programs and opportunities such as The Seminar, Summer School (an extension of the seminar), A Cooperative education program for High Performance Athletes, Spring school/Fall school, Canskate programs, and Power skating programs. Skaters from Canada, the United States, South Africa, China, Japan, and Europe have attended the events.

The most popular program is the Summer School program, which is an extension of "the Seminar". It usually begins mid-June, and can last from four days to seven weeks of training. The seminar contains on-ice program training and other components:

On-ice training
Jump techniques
Spin techniques
New judging system component mark development
Performance and theatre (interpretation of music)
Field movements (spirals, spread eagles, arm movements, etc.)
Stroking and edges
Footwork

Off-ice training
Mental training
Dartfish analysis
Jump analysis
Spin analysis
Warm up theory
Parent sessions
Personal development
Athlete management (healthy living, healthy eating, balancing life)

Off-ice movement sessions
Dynamic off-ice warm up
Footwork ladder sessions
Off-ice jump classes
Performance and theatre training
Dance classes (hip hop, ballet, and Jazz)

Coaches
The founders of Mariposa Skating School are Douglas Leigh, Lee Barkell, and David Islam. Many other coaches have participated in the seminars. Of the 35 coaches at Mariposa, the main ones (other than the founders) are Robert Tebby and Michelle Leigh. They have been deemed as primary coaches due to their extensive experience and their attainment of NCCP (National Coaching Certification Program) Level 4.

Former or current champions that still train at this association may provide demonstrations of spins, jumps, and other elements.

Charity gala
Since 1989, The Mariposa School of Skating has hosted an annual charity gala, usually held at the Barrie Molson Center in Barrie, Ontario. This event is sponsored by The Rotary Club of Barrie and proceeds go directly to the local charity projects of Royal Victoria Hospital Foundation "Rotary House". The Rotary House has provided lodging facilities close to cancer treatment which is valuable to both the patient and their families. Since the initiation of this project, over 1 million dollars has been raised to support this foundation.

The gala involves producing an ice show where former champions voluntarily perform skating programs. Skaters that have performed in the gala include Jeffrey Buttle, Jame Sale & David Pelltier, Marie-France Dubreill & Patrick Lauzon, Jennifer Robinson, Annabelle Langois & Cody Hayes, Lesley Hawker, Melissa Briggs, Christopher Mabee, and Steven Cousins.

Mariposa has also organized an annual celebrity golf tournament, in which skaters may participate. All proceeds of the event go towards the Alzheimer Society of Great Simcoe County which supports local Alzheimer patients and caregivers.

Notable students and alumni

Jeffrey Buttle
Josée Chouinard
Steven Cousins
Meagan Duhamel
Lenny Faustino
Ben Ferreira
Cody Hay
Takeshi Honda
Oula Jaaskelainen
Tuğba Karademir
Yuna Kim
Anabelle Langlois
Jacinthe Larivière
Marcus Leminen
Christopher Mabee
Danny Moir
Nobunari Oda
Brian Orser
Jennifer Robinson
Elvis Stojko
Tracey Wainman
Robert Paxton

See also
 BC Centre of Excellence

References

External links
 The Mariposa School of Skating
 Mariposa Charity Gala

Figure skating clubs in Canada
Sport in Barrie
1973 establishments in Ontario
Sports clubs established in 1973